Ernest Larry Brown (September 16, 1901 – April 7, 1972) was a baseball player in the Negro leagues. He would play catcher and played from 1921 to 1947.

External links
 and Baseball-Reference Black Baseball stats and Seamheads

 Larry Brown at SABR (Baseball BioProject)

1901 births
1972 deaths
Baseball catchers
Baseball players from Alabama
Chicago American Giants players
Detroit Stars players
Memphis Red Sox players
New York Black Yankees players
Lincoln Giants players
Philadelphia Stars players
Pittsburgh Keystones players
20th-century African-American sportspeople